Albion is a city in and the county seat of Boone County, Nebraska, United States. The population was 1,650 at the 2010 census.

Geography
Albion is located at  (41.689342, -98.003128).

History 
After several weeks of discussion, the name "Albion" was chosen in a game of euchre. Two men played for the name "Albion" and two played for the name "Manchester." The town was platted as "Albion" in 1872 by Loran Clark. The name is a transfer from Albion, Michigan. It was designated county seat in 1873.

Climate 
Albion has a humid continental climate (Köppen Dwa), with cold, dry winters and hot summers.

Demographics

2010 census
As of the census of 2010, there were 1,650 people, 747 households, and 443 families living in the city. The racial makeup of the city was 98.4% White, 0.2% African American, 0.5% Native American, 0.2% Asian, 0.1% Pacific Islander, 0.2% from other races, and 0.4% from two or more races. Hispanic or Latino of any race were 1.8% of the population.

There were 747 households, of which 24.0% had children under the age of 18 living with them, 48.9% were married couples living together, 7.4% had a female householder with no husband present, 3.1% had a male householder with no wife present, and 40.7% were non-families. 37.6% of all households were made up of individuals, and 23.6% had someone living alone who was 65 years of age or older. The average household size was 2.13 and the average family size was 2.80.

The median age in the city was 47.9 years. 21.6% of residents were under the age of 18; 5.9% were between the ages of 18 and 24; 19.5% were from 25 to 44; 25.1% were from 45 to 64; and 28.1% were 65 years of age or older. The gender makeup of the city was 46.2% male and 53.8% female.

2000 census
As of the census of 2000, there were 1,797 people, 754 households, and 465 families living in the city. The population density was 2,252.0 people per square mile (867.3/km). There were 835 housing units at an average density of 1,046.4 per square mile (403.0/km). The racial makeup of the city was 99.11% White, 0.06% Native American, 0.06% Pacific Islander, 0.33% from other races, and 0.45% from two or more races. Hispanic or Latino of any race were 0.95% of the population.

There were 754 households, out of which 29.3% had children under the age of 18 living with them, 52.8% were married couples living together, 7.3% had a female householder with no husband present, and 38.3% were non-families. 35.8% of all households were made up of individuals, and 21.8% had someone living alone who was 65 years of age or older. The average household size was 2.30 and the average family size was 3.01.

In the city, the population was spread out, with 26.0% under the age of 18, 5.4% from 18 to 24, 21.9% from 25 to 44, 20.7% from 45 to 64, and 26.0% who were 65 years of age or older. The median age was 43 years. For every 100 females, there were 82.8 males. For every 100 females age 18 and over, there were 79.0 males.

As of 2000 the median income for a household in the city was $31,111, and the median income for a family was $42,105. Males had a median income of $27,227 versus $18,750 for females. The per capita income for the city was $17,875. About 5.3% of families and 7.3% of the population were below the poverty line, including 9.0% of those under age 18 and 7.5% of those age 65 or over. The town ranks 117th of 537 Nebraska locations ranked per capita.

Notable people 
 Historian Viola Florence Barnes
 Major League Baseball pitcher Al Mahon
 Former United States Secretary of the Navy Francis P. Matthews
 Nebraska politician William A. Poynter

References

External links
 City of Albion, NE

Cities in Boone County, Nebraska
Cities in Nebraska
County seats in Nebraska